The FIS Ski Flying World Ski Championships 1981 took place in Oberstdorf, West Germany for the second time. Oberstdorf hosted the FIS Ski Flying World Championships in 1973.

Individual

Medal table

References
 FIS Ski flying World Championships 1981 results. - accessed 25 November 2009.

FIS Ski Flying World Championships
1981 in ski jumping
1981 in West German sport
Sports competitions in Bavaria
1981 in Bavaria
Ski jumping competitions in West Germany